Bridge Hewick is a village and civil parish in the Harrogate district of North Yorkshire, England. The population was recorded at less than 100 at the 2011 Census. Details are included on the statistics of the civil parish of Copt Hewick. North Yorkshire County Council estimate that the population at the 2011 census was 50, which had risen to 60 by 2015.

According to A Dictionary of British Place Names, 'Bridge Hewick' could be derived from the Old English 'brycg' for "at the bridge", with 'heah+wic', meaning a "high or chief dairy-farm". Hewick is recorded in the 1086 Domesday Book as "Heawic", in the Hallikeld Hundred of the West Riding of Yorkshire. Listed for the settlement are three ploughlands and a meadow of one acre. In 1066 the lord of Hewick was Ealdred, Archbishop of York; lordship in 1086, after the Conquest, was held by the following archbishop, Thomas of Bayeux, who was also Tenant-in-chief to King William.

In 1837, Bridge Hewick population was 77. A chapel in Bridge Hewick was in 1826 described as "in ruins".

The Bridge Hewick local public house is the Black-A-Moor Inn. The Bridge over the River Ure is the starting point of a circular walk around Ripon known as the Sanctuary Way Walk.

References

External links

Villages in North Yorkshire
Civil parishes in North Yorkshire